Ashburton Playing Fields is a playing field located in Woodside, London. It is managed by the London Borough of Croydon. The fields are bordered by Bywood Avenue in the north, Chaucer Green in the west and Woodville Avenue in the east. Stroud Green Way backs onto the western boundary. Tramlink services for the park are Arena and Woodside.

Facilities include football and cricket pitches, changing rooms, and children's playground. The fields are open 24 hours per day throughout the year, although pitches and use of changing rooms have to be booked in advance.

See also
List of Parks and Open Spaces in Croydon
Ashburton Park
Ashburton
Croydon Sports Arena

References

External links
Croydon Council - Ashburton Playing Fields
Croydon Council - History

Parks and open spaces in the London Borough of Croydon